Acaronychidae is a family of mites belonging to the order Sarcoptiformes.

Genera:
 Acaronychus Grandjean, 1932
 Archeonothrus Trägårdh, 1906
 Loftacarus Lee, 1981
 Stomacarus Grandjean, 1952
 Zachvatkinella Lange, 1954

References

Sarcoptiformes